The Miracle Mile is a prominent shopping district in Manhasset in Nassau County, on the North Shore of Long Island, in New York, United States. It consists of the area along Northern Boulevard between Community Drive to the west, and Port Washington Boulevard and Searingtown Road to the east.

History 
Much of the corridor was initially developed in the 1950s by Sol Atlas. It was named the Miracle Mile in reference to the Los Angeles neighborhood, and inspired by its rapid development after decades of depression and war, and the difficulty in developing a commercial corridor in a primarily residential area.

It is well known for its later high-end premium open-air shopping center, the Americana Manhasset. The Miracle Mile has been a mainstay in suburban shopping and for many years featured a Lord & Taylor, often referred to as the first branch store in America. In addition to Lord & Taylor, Manhasset supported branches of some of the most well known stores in New York over the years - B. Altman & Co, Bonwit Teller, Abraham & Straus(Now Macy’s), Best & Co., Arnold Constable, Franklin Simon & Co., Peck & Peck, H&M, W. & J. Sloane and a J.J. Newberry. 

On August 27, 2020, it was announced that Lord & Taylor would be closing all remaining stores. The store closed on February 27, 2021 and became a SaksWorks.

In popular culture

The Miracle Mile is mentioned in the Billy Joel song "It's Still Rock and Roll to Me."

References

External links 
 Americana Manhasset
 Chamber of Commerce Members - Miracle Mile

Manhasset, New York
Shopping districts and streets in the United States
Tourist attractions in Nassau County, New York